Olga Nikolaevna Knyazeva (9 August 1954 – 3 January 2015) was a Soviet foil fencer. She won a team gold medal at the 1976 Olympics and placed ninth individually. She also won four gold and two silver medals at the world championships between 1973 and 1978.

Knyazeva took up fencing in 1966 and between 1972 and 1978, was a member of the Soviet national team. In 1975 she won the World Cup, the European Team Cup, and the team world title, and was named best female fencer of the year by the Fédération Internationale d'Escrime. After retiring from competitions she worked as a fencing coach in Kazan and taught physical education at the Kazan State Finance and Economics Institute.

After the 1976 Olympics Knyazeva married Rafael Dubov, who was her childhood friend, a fellow fencer, and later a fencing coach and referee. Their children, son Aleksandr and daughter Nina, also competed in fencing.

References

External links
 

1954 births
2015 deaths
Russian female foil fencers
Soviet female foil fencers
Olympic fencers of the Soviet Union
Fencers at the 1976 Summer Olympics
Olympic gold medalists for the Soviet Union
Sportspeople from Kazan
Olympic medalists in fencing
Medalists at the 1976 Summer Olympics